Gafni is a surname. Notable people with the surname include:

Adi Gafni, Israeli sprint canoer
Isaiah Gafni (born 1944), Israeli historian
Marc Gafni (born 1960), American spiritual writer
Moshe Gafni (born 1952), Israeli politician

See also
Gani